Na Muean is a district (amphoe) in the southern part of Nan province, northern Thailand.

History
The minor district (king amphoe) Na Muean was established on 9 October 1978 as a subordinate of Na Noi district, from which it was split off. Originally it consisted of the three tambons, Na Thanung, Bo Kaeo, and Mueang Li. It was upgraded to a full district on 4 July 1994.

Geography

Neighboring districts are, from the north clockwise, Na Noi of Nan Province, Ban Khok, Fak Tha, Nam Pat and Tha Pla of Uttaradit province, Mueang Phrae and Rong Kwang of Phrae province.

Administration
The district is divided into four sub-districts (tambons), which are further subdivided into 48 villages (mubans). Bo Kaeo is the township (thesaban tambon) and covers the complete area of tambon Bo Kaeo. There are a further three tambon administrative organizations (TAO).

References

External links
amphoe.com

Na Muean